Touch is a 2020 South Korean television series starring Joo Sang-wook and Kim Bo-ra. It aired on Channel A from January 3 to February 22, 2020.

Synopsis
A romantic comedy and beauty drama, where a makeup artist, who has become unemployed after failing to become an idol trainee, finds a new dream.

Cast

Main
 Joo Sang-wook as Cha Jung-Hyuk, a beauty representative and makeup artist.
 Kim Bo-ra as Han Soo-yeon, the youngest assistant in tea beauty.

Supporting
 Ahn Sol-bin as Song Ha-won
 Han Da-gam 
 Lee Tae-hwan
 Byun Jung-soo
 Yoon Hee-seok
 Hong Seok-cheon
 Son Woo-hyeon as Lee Hyun-joon
 Ahn Dong Yeop
 Jung Ji-yoon as Na Hye-jin
 Lee Su-ji
 Park Joong-geun
 Kim Young-jun
 Lee Sang-ah
 Kim Gwang-sik
 Yeonwoo as Jung Young-ah, an broadcast jockey and Han Soo-yeon's best friend.
 Song Jae-hee
 Lee Chaeeun
 Chae Joo-Hwa
 Shin Jun-Chul

Special appearances
 Moon Sook as Yoon Young Hee (CEO of Ohsung Grup) (Ep. 6)
 Seo Ji Hoon
 Lee Yul-eum as Girl on the plane	
 Park Soo-hong

Ratings
In this table,  represent the lowest ratings and  represent the highest ratings.

References

External links 
 
 

Korean-language television shows
Channel A television dramas
2020 South Korean television series debuts
2020 South Korean television series endings
South Korean romantic comedy television series
South Korean drama television series